Bottom Boat is a village in the Wakefield district of West Yorkshire. In the 2011 United Kingdom census, its population was 1,169, and it was included as part of the West Yorkshire Built-up Area, which had a total population of 1,777,934.

Before the enactment of the 1972 Local Government Act, it was part of the Stanley Urban District.

Most of the current houses in Bottom Boat were built for workers at the Newmarket Silkstone Colliery. The colliery closed on 29 September 1983, which was only a few months before the start of a year-long strike in the British mining industry. This closure was not opposed by the NUM as it had been agreed under the previous Labour Government's "Plan for Coal" on the condition that the workforce could transfer to the new Selby Coalfield.

References

Villages in West Yorkshire
Geography of the City of Wakefield